Mechanical thrombectomy, or simply thrombectomy, is the removal of a blood clot (thrombus) from a blood vessel, often and especially endovascularly as an interventional radiology procedure called endovascular thrombectomy (EVT). It thus contrasts with thrombolysis (clot dissolution) by thrombolytic medications (e.g., alteplase, reteplase), as either alternative or complement thereto. It is commonly performed in the cerebral arteries (interventional neuroradiology) as treatment to reverse the ischemia in some ischemic strokes (i.e., those in which the blockage is a suitable candidate for such retrieval). Open vascular surgery versions of thrombectomy also exist. The effectiveness of thrombectomy for strokes was confirmed in several randomised clinical trials conducted at various medical centers throughout the United States, as reported in a seminal multistudy report in 2015.

Applications in brain 
Ischemic stroke represents the fifth most common cause of death in the western world and the number one cause of long-term disability. Until recent times, systemic intravenous fibrinolysis was the only evidence-based therapy for patients with acute onset of stroke due to large vessel occlusion.

In 2015, the results of five trials from different countries were published in the New England Journal of Medicine, demonstrating the safety and efficacy of mechanical thrombectomy with stent-retrievers in improving outcomes and reducing mortality for patients who present within six hours from their time last known well. It is now a widespread procedure performed in many hospitals around the globe, especially comprehensive stroke centers, although many other hospitals are not yet able to supply the service enough to meet the need. Large obstacles to making EVT more widely available are both systematic hurdles at the prehospital stages and the intrahospital barrier of a scarcity of interventional neuroradiologists. They concern TTR (time to reperfusion), which is the same underlying problem as the golden hour in general, albeit several hours in the case of TTR: that is, EVT performed within 2 or 3 hours can help vastly, whereas EVT performed after 6 to 12 hours is often (although not always) too late to prevent the permanent sequelae of the ischemia. In this respect, the dissemination of EVT into clinical practice shows how translational medicine has various layers, some easier to solve and some harder: it was in some respects straightforward to develop the technology of EVT in the 2000s and 2010s (that is, the catheter tips and procedures), but it is not easy to revamp the standard of care in prehospital settings (such as awareness among family members and bystanders, optimal techniques for emergency medical services, and so on), which deployment of timely EVT requires.

In 2018 the DAWN and DEFUSE-3 trials were published. These trials showed that mechanical thrombectomy is a safe and effective treatment for individuals who have an acute ischemic stroke, even (in some cases) out to 24 hours after symptom onset.

Stent-retriever thrombectomy 
The procedure can be performed with general anesthesia or under conscious sedation in an angiographic room. A system of coaxial catheters is pushed inside the arterial circulation, usually through a percutaneous access to the right femoral artery. A microcatheter is finally positioned beyond the occluded segment and a stent-retriever is deployed to catch the thrombus; finally, the stent is pulled out from the artery, usually under continuous aspiration in the larger catheters.

Direct aspiration 
A different technique for mechanical thrombectomy in the brain is direct aspiration. It is performed by pushing a large soft aspiration catheter into the occluded vessel and applying direct aspiration to retrieve the thrombus; it can be combined with the stent-retriever technique to achieve higher recanalization rates, but the complexity of the procedure increases.

Direct aspiration has not been studied as thoroughly as stent-retriever thrombectomy, but it is still widely performed because of its relative simplicity and low cost.

Delivery
Patients in London who suffered stroke were found to be much more likely to get thrombectomy in 2022 than those in other parts of England.  42%  of thrombectomy units only operated during office hours and Monday to Friday, largely due to a shortage of neuroinerventionalists.

See also 
 Stroke
 Embolectomy
 Pulmonary thromboendarterectomy

References

External links 
 
 Endovascular clot retrieval (ECR) | Radiology Reference Article | Radiopaedia.org
 Failed Thrombectomy

Neurology procedures
Vascular procedures